The Transylvanian Peasants' Party (PȚT) was a political party in Romania.

History
In the 1919 elections it won four seats in the Chamber of Deputies. The 1920 elections saw the party win six seats. However, it did not contest any further elections.

Electoral history

Legislative elections

References

Agrarian parties in Romania
Defunct political parties in Romania